Events in the year 1889 in Brazil.

Incumbents

Federal Government 
 Monarch – Pedro II (until 15 November)
 Prime Minister – João Alfredo Correia de Oliveira (until 7 June); Afonso Celso, Viscount of Ouro Preto (from 7 June to 15 November), none (from 15 November)
 President – Marshal Deodoro da Fonseca (de facto, from 15 November)
 Vice-President – none

Governors 
 Alagoas: Government Junta (18 November-21), Tiburcio Valerio de Araujo (21 November-2 December), Pedro Paulino da Fonseca (starting 2 December)
 Amazonas: Government Junta (starting 21 November)
 Bahia: Virginio Climaco Damasio then Manuel Vitorino Pereira
 Ceará: Luis Antonio Ferraz (starting 16 November)
 Goiás: Government Junta (starting 7 December)
 Maranhão:
 Mato Grosso: Antonio Maria Coelho
 Minas Gerais: Antonio Olinto dos Santos Pires
 Pará: Justo Chermont (starting 17 December)
 Paraíba: Venancio Neiva (starting 17 November)
 Paraná: Francisco José Cardoso Júnior then José Marques Guimarães
 Pernambuco: José Cerqueira de Aguiar Lima (16 November-12 December), José Simeão de Oliveira (starting 12 December)
 Piauí: Gregório Taumaturgo de Azevedo (starting 26 December)
 Rio Grande do Norte: Pedro de Albuquerque Maranhão (17 November-6 December), Adolfo Afonso da Silva Gordo (starting 6 December)
 Rio Grande do Sul: Government Junta (starting 17 November)
 Santa Catarina: Lauro Müller (starting 2 December)
 São Paulo: Government Junta (starting 14 December)
 Sergipe: Junta Governativa Sergipana (starting 14 November), Felisbelo Firmo de Oliveira Freire (starting 2 December)

Vice governors
 Rio Grande do Norte: No vice governor
 São Paulo: No vice governor

Events 
3 May – The Cabinet of João Alfredo Correia de Oliveira loses a vote of no confidence.
7 June – Afonso Celso de Assis Figuereido, Viscount of Ouro Preto, is appointed to replace Correia de Oliveira as prime minister.
July – Emperor Dom Pedro II travels to Minas Gerais, demonstrating both that he is still actively engaged in government and the depth of support for the monarchy in the province.
 11 November – Republicans meet at the home of Rui Barbosa to plan a coup.  The chief organizers are Benjamin Constant, Marshal Deodoro da Fonseca, Quintino Bocaiúva and Aristides Lobo.
 15 November – A coup d'état institutes the First Brazilian Republic.
 17 November – Emperor Dom Pedro II and his family are sent into exile in Europe.
 19 November – A new national flag, devised by Raimundo Teixeira Mendes, is adopted by the republic.
 24 December – The former royal family receive official notice that they will never be allowed to return to Brazil.

Arts and culture

Books
Osório Duque-Estrada – A Aristocracia do Espírito

Births 
 2 December – Anita Malfatti, artist (d. 1964)
 unknown date – José Maria de Santo Agostinho, mystic (d. 1912)

Deaths 
 29 March – Teófilo Dias, poet, journalist and lawyer (b. 1854)
 26 June – Tobias Barreto, poet, philosopher, jurist and critic (b. 1839)
 28 June – Francisco Otaviano, poet, lawyer, diplomat, journalist and politician (b. 1825)
 21 October – Irineu Evangelista de Sousa, Viscount of Mauá, entrepreneur, industrialist, banker and politician (b. 1813) 
 28 December – Empress Teresa Cristina, wife of Emperor Dom Pedro II (b. 1822)

References 

 
1880s in Brazil
Years of the 19th century in Brazil
Brazil
Brazil